South Johnstone is a rural town and locality in the Cassowary Coast Region, Queensland, Australia.

Geography

History
South Johnstone State School was opened on 5 June 1916. The school celebrated its 100th anniversary in 2016.

St Rita's Catholic School was established on 1 February 1932 by the Sisters of the Good Samaritan.

The South Johnstone parish of the Roman Catholic Diocese of Cairns was established in 1947. It is now merged with the Innisfail and Mourilyian parishes.

The town was originally called Basilisk until 1954, when it was officially renamed South Johnstone after the South Johnstone River. The river was named by George Elphinstone Dalrymple in honour of Robert Johnstone who accompanied him on an expedition in 1873. The name Basilisk is now used for a nearby locality.

Heritage listings
South Johnstone has a number of heritage-listed sites, including:
 26 Hynes Street: St Saviour's Anglican Church

Education 
South Johnstone State School is a government primary (Prep-6) school for boys and girls at East Avenue. In 2017, the school had an enrolment of 31 students with 3 teachers and 6 non-teaching staff (3 full-time equivalent).

St Rita's School is a Catholic primary (Prep-6) school for boys and girls at 8 Green Street. In 2017, the school had an enrolment of 117 students with 15 teachers (10 full-time equivalent) and 13 non-teaching staff (5 full-time equivalent).

Amenities 
St Rita's Catholic Church is at 5 Green Street. It is within the Innisfail Parish of the Roman Catholic Diocese of Cairns.

See also
 List of tramways in Queensland

References

External links

 
 

 
Towns in Queensland
Cassowary Coast Region
Localities in Queensland